Saint-Selve is a commune in the Gironde department in Nouvelle-Aquitaine in southwestern France. The 18th-century French playwright and librettist Jean-Paul-André Razins de Saint-Marc was born in the nearby château des Razins 29 November 1728.

Population

See also
Communes of the Gironde department

References

Communes of Gironde